Liberga is a small village in the Municipality of Šmartno pri Litiji in central Slovenia. It lies in the Sava Hills east of Velika Kostrevnica. The area is part of the historical region of Lower Carniola. The municipality is now included in the Central Slovenia Statistical Region.

References

External links
Liberga at Geopedia

Populated places in the Municipality of Šmartno pri Litiji